Nikola Pasic (Serbian: Никола Пашић, Nikola Pašić; born 16 October 2000) is a Swedish professional ice hockey forward currently playing for Södertälje SK of the HockeyAllsvenskan (Allsv). Pasic was drafted 189th overall by the New Jersey Devils in the 2019 NHL Entry Draft.

Playing career
Pasic made his Swedish Hockey League (SHL) debut with Linköping HC during the 2017–18 SHL season, appearing in 3 regular season games. During the following 2018–19 season, Pasic made 15 appearances with the club before he was loaned to continue his development to BIK Karlskoga of the HockeyAllsvenskan.

He secured a season-long loan to BIK for the 2019–20 season, responding by posting an impressive 27 assists and 35 points as a 19-year old in 45 games.

During the 2021–22 season, after going scoreless through 13 games with Linköping HC in a reduced role, Pasic left the club and joined second tier Allsvenskan club, Södertälje SK, on 6 December 2021.

Personal life
He is of Serbian descent.

Career statistics

Regular season and playoffs

International

References

External links

2000 births
Living people
BIK Karlskoga players
Linköping HC players
New Jersey Devils draft picks
People from Gislaved Municipality
Södertälje SK players
Swedish ice hockey forwards
Sportspeople from Jönköping County